Water by the Spoonful is a play by Quiara Alegría Hudes as the second part of the Elliot Trilogy. This play is released five years after the first section of the trilogy, Elliot A Soldier's Fugue, comes out. The story is set in both the virtual and physical world in Philadelphia, Japan, and Puerto Rico. 

The play won the 2012 Pulitzer Prize for Drama.

Concept
Water by the Spoonful is the second part of a trilogy that began with Elliot, A Soldier's Fugue and concludes with The Happiest Song Plays Last. The first part of the trilogy is "about a young Marine, Elliot Ortiz,  coming to terms with his time in Iraq and his father's and grandfather's service in Vietnam and Korea". Water by the Spoonful takes place several years after, Elliot, a veteran, has returned to his home in Philadelphia after being wounded while serving in Iraq. The play depicts the aftermath of the death of Ginny, Elliot's adoptive mother. As Elliot and his cousin Yaz attempt to process their loss, Ginny's sister Odessa, Elliot's biological mother, bonds with other recovering addicts on the Narcotics Anonymous support chat room she moderates.

Characters
 Elliot Ortiz: A twenty-four-year-old Puerto Rican aspiring model and Iraq War vet with a limp. The biological son of Odessa and adopted son of Ginny (who does not appear in the play), he is plagued by hallucinations from his violent past.
 Yazmin Ortiz: Elliot's twenty-nine-year-old cousin, niece to Odessa and adjunct professor at Swarthmore College.
 Odessa Ortiz: Elliot's birth mother, thirty-nine, who goes by the alias Haikumom on her Narcotics Anonymous site. Lives in poverty and works as a janitor.
 Chutes&Ladders: A recovering addict on Haikumom's site. Also known as Clayton "Buddy" Wilkie, a fifty-six-year-old African-American IRS employee in San Diego. Develops a close bond with Orangutan.
 Orangutan: A recovering addict on Haikumom's site. Born Yoshiko Sakai, now known in real life as Madeleine Mays. Adopted from Japan by white parents as a baby, she has now returned to Japan in her twenties to discover her identity.
 Fountainhead: An addict on Haikumom's site. Real name John, a white Philadelphia Main Line resident, aged forty-one. Married with children. 
 A Ghost: A manifestation of Elliot's first kill, repeats the line "Can I please have my passport back?" in Arabic. Also plays a Japanese policeman and Yazmin's colleague at Swarthmore College, Arabic Studies Professor Aman.

Plot
Picking up seven years after Elliot, A Soldier's Fugue, war-wounded Elliot Ortiz has returned to his home town of Philadelphia, where he now works at a sandwich shop and cares for his ailing aunt Ginny, who raised him. He is coping with recurring bouts of posttraumatic stress disorder, characterized by visions of the apparition of a man who continually offers a hand and repeats an Arabic phrase. Elliot's cousin Yazmin, a Swarthmore College music professor in the middle of a divorce, introduces him to Professor Aman, from Swarthmore's Arabic Studies department. Elliot hopes to decipher the phrase the ghost repeats, but Aman, intrigued by Elliot's refusal to explain the phrase's origin, offers an exchange: he will translate the phrase if Elliot agrees to contact a filmmaker friend of his who is making a documentary about the Iraq War. When Elliot accepts, Aman reveals that the phrase translates to "Can I please have my passport back?".

Odessa, who is Elliot's birth mother and Ginny's sister, is a recovering crack addict who uses the alias Haikumom to moderate an anonymous online message board for recovering addictssuch as Orangutan and Chutes&Ladders. Orangutan, who has worried Haikumom and Chutes&Ladders by not logging into the site for three months, eases their minds by posting that she is ninety days sober and has moved to Japan.

The calming interchange on the message board is compromised when Fountainhead, a wealthy Philadelphian and addict-in-denial, sows discord. Odessa wants to welcome him, but Orangutan and Chutes&Ladders doubt his intentions, especially when he pleads for a solution to his addiction that does not involve telling his wife. Orangutan also encourages Chutes&Ladders to visit her in Japan, but he refuses, fearing the awkwardness of the meeting and the break from the routine he has built for himself might threaten his ten-year sobriety.

Ginny passes away, leaving Elliot and Yazmin with limited funds for her funeral. As they struggle to gather money from the family, Odessa meets Fountainhead in person at a café to discuss rehab and treatment options. Yazmin and Elliot arrive and confront Odessa for her failure to contribute financially. Elliot, enraged by her disloyalty to her own family, reveals to Fountainhead that Odessa also had a daughter, who died of dehydration from the flu when she was two years old. He openly blames Odessa, claiming that she was too busy getting high on crack to give his sister the "water by the spoonful" she needed to survive. Shamed, Odessa gives Elliot permission to pawn her personal computer for Ginny's funeral expenses. He and Yazmin go to Odessa's apartment to retrieve it, and Elliot logs in and poses as her on the message board, cruelly insulting Orangutan. When Yazmin grabs the keyboard to apologize and explains that it is Haikumom's son using the computer, Orangutan surprises them by revealing that Haikumom has always spoken very highly of Elliot on the site, begrudging her lack of presence in his life due to her addiction.

Orangutan posts that she plans to visit her birth parents' address, but Chutes&Ladders vehemently attempts to dissuade her, telling her that no good can come of it and the emotion of the visit might make her want to use again. Orangutan disagrees, arguing that she prefers uncertainty about the future to Chutes&Ladders' strict routine, and leaves to visit her parents. Overnight, Odessa relapses and overdoses, and the hospital calls Fountainhead, whom she listed as an emergency contact for reasons he cannot fathom. In the morning, Orangutan logs back on and reveals that she did not actually board the train, but Chutes&Ladders responds by saying that he has decided to face his fears and has bought a ticket to Japan. Fountainhead then enters the chat with the news about Odessa, and Chutes&Ladders convinces him that it is now his duty to take care of her. Fountainhead agrees and calls his wife, telling her where to find the message board so she can read and understand what he has been facing.

Orangutan and Chutes&Ladders finally meet in person in Japan. Yazmin and Elliot scatter Ginny's ashes in Puerto Rico. Yazmin plans to purchase Ginny's house to start her family there, while Elliot vows to pursue his acting dream in Los Angeles.

Productions
 The play, which was commissioned by Hartford Stage as part of Hudes' 2008-2009 Aetna New Voices Fellowship, debuted at Hartford Stage in October 2011.

 The play premiered off-Broadway at the Second Stage Theatre on December 11, 2012 (previews), and ran to February 10th, 2013. Directed by Davis McCallum (who also directed the Hartford Stage production), the cast featured Armando Riesco, Liza Colón-Zayas and Zabryna Guevara.

 Second Stage Theatre on January 27, 2013, hosted a Hudes Elliot Trilogy, where Water by the Spoonful was done in full production and directed by David McCallum. 

 The University of Iowa in 2013 put on this production directed by Tlaloc Rivas at the David Thayer Theatre. 

 Arden Theatre Company (Philadelphia) from January 16th to March 16th, 2014 ran this production directed by Lucie Tiberghien on the arcadia stage. 

 The Oregon Shakespeare Festival in 2014 began an online streaming service for Water by the Spoonful, running September 1st through the 25th. This production was directed by Shishir Kurup. The cast featured Daniel Molina, Vilma Silva, and Nancy Rodriguez.   

 In 2015, Theatre Twenty-Two in Seattle put on this production directed by Julie Beckman from October 23rd to November 14th. 

 In 2016, the Curious Theatre Company put on this production directed by Chip Walton from September 3rd to October 15th. The cast included Thony Mena, GerRee Hinshaw and Gabriella Cavellero. 

 Center Theatre Group from January 31st to March 11th, 2018 ran this production directed by Lileana Blain-Cruz. 

 In 2019, Indiana University Bloomington at Wells-Metz Theatre put on this production from November 8th to 16th which was directed by Rachel Nicole Pierce. 

 Teatro Paraguas, Ironweed Productions, and Santa Fe Playhouse in 2019 put on the Elliot Trilogy, including Water by the Spoonful, directed by Valli Marie Rivera.

Critical response 
 Pulitzer.org describes the play as "...an imaginative play about the search for meaning by a returning Iraq War veteran working in a sandwich shop in his hometown of Philadelphia." The Boston Globe describes it as a story of "...an Iraq war veteran struggling to find his place in the world..." 

 David Ng of The Los Angeles Times says the play "follows an Iraq war veteran who is struggling with civilian life. His story runs in parallel with those of four individuals who connect on an online chatroom dedicated to recovering drug addicts."

  Erik Piepenburg of The New York Times describes the subject of the play as "..a Puerto Rican veteran of the Iraq war who faces personal demons when he returns to the United States".

 Charles McNulty, a theater critic with the LA Times, describes the play, "Water by the Spoonful," Quiara Alegría Hudes' Pulitzer Prize winner, is a family drama that redefines what family means for those struggling not to fall through the cracks of an increasingly fractured society.

 Chris Jones (drama critic), the chief theatre critic for the Chicago Tribune, says, "This play somehow drives to a quieter yet deeper depth, offering the wholly fulfilling sense that everyone on the stage is, by their creator, known."

 Peter Marks, a theatre critic with the Washington Post, said when describing the play, "It's a sensitively wrought piece, with an ambitious range of concerns and some interesting observations about the families we're born into and the ones we create in a modern age, in therapeutic situations, and even online."

The play was published in 2012 by Theatre Communications Group. Hudes had previously won the 2008 Tony Award for Best Musical for In the Heights.

References

External links
Pulitzer page
Internet Off-Broadway Database
Hartford Stage PR page

2011 plays
Off-Broadway plays
Pulitzer Prize for Drama-winning works
Hispanic and Latino American plays